The 6mm Advanced Rifle Cartridge (6×38mm), or 6mm ARC for short, is a 6 mm (.243) caliber intermediate rifle cartridge introduced by Hornady in 2020, as a low-recoil, high-accuracy long-range cartridge, designed for use in the AR-15 platform at request of a specialized group within the U.S. DoD for its multipurpose combat rifle program.

Performance 
The cartridge makes use of 6 mm (.243 in) bullets, which are known for their high ballistic coefficients due to the high sectional density with less drag and better energy retention at extended ranges.  With the release in 2020, Hornady also launched three factory loads with  bullet weights and advertised G1 ballistic coefficients of .512, .530 and .536 respectively.

The 6mm ARC is a medium-power cartridge comparable to the 6.5mm Grendel, but with better ballistics thanks to the greater muzzle velocity achieved by using lighter 6 mm bullets and enough power to make use of the heavy 6 mm bullets. Some have stated that it offers comparable ballistics to larger 6 mm cartridges like the 6mm Creedmoor and .243 Winchester, but out of a smaller cartridge, however this simply is not true when comparing muzzle velocities between them. What the 6mm ARC does offer though is almost comparable velocities and ballistic performance, but out of a compact cartridge that has lessened perceived recoil and fits into the standard AR-15 length actions.

In addition to the above comments there is some confusion regarding the 6 mm ARC's performance. This is because loading data given in some manuals such as the 11th Edition Hornady Reloading Manual ,for example, has two sets of data. The first set of data is loaded to the SAAMI maximum average pressure (MAP) of 52,000 psi, which is stated to be suitable for gas-operated firearms such as the AR-15 platform and its derivatives. The second set of data is loaded to a MAP of 62,000 psi, which is stated to be for use with bolt action guns such as the CZ 527. The Hornady manual states that this second set of data should not be used in gas-guns. Due to the lower MAP, the performance of 6mm ARC ammunition loaded to gas-gun pressures will, on average, be less than firearms loaded to bolt action pressures when using the same barrel length. When using shorter barrels, which are common on gas-guns, the difference will be even more pronounced.

For example, the data in the Hornady 11th Edition Manual for an 18 in (457 mm)-barrelled AR-15 platform firearm was on average 200-300 ft/s (60-90 m/s) less than the data for the 24 in (610 mm)-barrelled CZ 527 bolt action rifle.

SAAMI spec

Compatibility with the AR-15 
For an ordinary AR-15 rifle chambered for the .223 Rem/5.56mm NATO, a new barrel, magazine and bolt are required to convert to the 6mm ARC. The 6mm ARC utilizes the same bolt head size as the 6.5mm Grendel, and 6.5mm Grendel-compatible AR-pattern box magazines have also been used successfully with the 6mm ARC. The 6mm ARC therefore can also be a suitable chambering for shorter "micro-action" bolt-action rifles.

See also 
 .223 Remington
 6mm AR
 "6mm Optimum", a concept of a 6 mm cartridge bridging the gap between the 5.56×45mm NATO and 7.62×51mm NATO cartridges
 6 PPC

References 

Pistol and rifle cartridges